The nuthatch vanga (Hypositta corallirostris), also known as the coral-billed nuthatch-vanga and formerly as the coral-billed nuthatch, is a species of bird in the family Vangidae.
It is endemic to Madagascar.

Its natural habitat is subtropical or tropical moist lowland forests.

References

nuthatch vanga
Endemic birds of Madagascar
nuthatch vanga
Taxonomy articles created by Polbot